Sándor Hautzinger (21 November 1885 – 2 May 1973), also known as Alexander Hautzinger, was a Hungarian rower. He competed at the 1908 Summer Olympics in London with the men's eight where they were eliminated in round one.

References

External links
 

1885 births
1973 deaths
Hungarian male rowers
Olympic rowers of Hungary
Rowers at the 1908 Summer Olympics
Rowers at the 1924 Summer Olympics
Rowers at the 1928 Summer Olympics
Sportspeople from Burgenland
European Rowing Championships medalists